Two Pennies Worth of Violets (French: Deux sous de violettes) is a 1951 French drama film directed by Jean Anouilh and starring Dany Robin, Georges Baconnet and Madeleine Barbulée. It was one of two films directed by the dramatist Anouilh along with Traveling Light (1944). It was shot at the Billancourt Studios in Paris. The film's sets were designed by the art director Léon Barsacq.

Synopsis
Thérèse is a young flower seller in Paris who has had a hard life with an unsympathetic family. Her encounters with men are also tragic as they prove to be either predatory or abandon her when she needs them most.

Cast
 Dany Robin as Thérèse Desforges
 Georges Baconnet as Pignot - le fleuriste 
 Madeleine Barbulée as La chanteuse des rues
 Michel Bouquet as Maurice Desforges
 Georges Chamarat as 	Monsieur Dubreck 
 Jacques Clancy as André Delgrange 
 Léonce Corne as Le médecin
 Henri Crémieux as Bousquet
 Max Dalban as Le cafetier
 Mona Dol as 	Madame Lambert
 Yvette Etiévant as Lucienne Desforge
 Gabrielle Fontan as La concierge
 Madeleine Geoffroy as Madame Pignot
 Yolande Laffon as Madame Delgrange
 Madeleine Lambert as Une amie
 Héléna Manson as Jeanne Desforges
 Jane Marken as Madame Dubreck
 Geneviève Morel as Germaine
 Marcel Pérès as Le contremaître
 Jean Pommier as Yvon
 Marcelle Praince as Une vieille dame
 Yves Robert as Charlot
 Etienne Yvernès as Le garçon
 Monique Watteau as Simone

References

Bibliography 
Oscherwitz, Dayna & Higgins, Maryellen. The A to Z of French Cinema. Scarecrow Press, 2009.

External links 
 

1951 films
1951 drama films
French drama films
1950s French-language films
Gaumont Film Company films
Films set in Paris
Films shot at Billancourt Studios
1950s French films